Ron van der Ende (born 1965) is a Dutch visual artist, who works as sculptor, installation artist, and video artist. He is known for his monumental bas-reliefs, depicting objects such as cars, buildings and space capsules.

Biography 
Van der Ende was born in Delft in 1965 and raised in Maasdijk, Westland, where his father worked in a carpentry factory. He studied art at the Academy of Fine Arts and Technical Sciences in Rotterdam, now Willem de Kooning Academy, from 1984 to 1988. He had started studying painting, but later switched to sculpture. 

After his studies in 1988 he settled as artist in Rotterdam. In the same year he co-founded the artists' collective ExpoHenK, and had his first exhibition in the Rotterdam gallery Dyonisus. In 1990 he was awarded the WdKA Maaskantprijs for a 1988 wall installation made out of six wooden objects of the same size based on historical drawings. 

Van der Ende continued to construct wooden objects. In 2000 he started making his famous bas-reliefs by fixing pieces of veneer on wooden base constructions. They are made out of used wood, which usually contains the original layer of paint, such as old doors and other scrap wood.

Gallery

Exhibitions, a selection 
Group exhibitions, a selection
 1988. It's Boring but it's true!, Dyonisus, Rotterdam.
 1989. Lineart, Ghent, Belgium; with Galerie Delta.
 1990. Poliset, Gallery Givichi d’Arte Moderna, Ferrara, Italy.
 1992. ..Autodesign in Nederland.., Kunsthal, Rotterdam. 
 1998. Industrieel Landschap.  Gothaer Kunstforum Köln, Cologne, DE; project with Freek Drent.
 2009. Kunst uit Huis V: Ron Klein Breteler, Stedelijk Museum Schiedam.
 2011. Will Be Home, Ambach & Rice, Los Angeles CA, USA.

International solo exhibition, a selection
 2008. Motor Memory,  OkOk Gallery, Seattle WA, USA.
 2010. A Shallow Wade Ambach & Rice, Seattle WA, USA
 2011. Perishables,  The Armory Show, New York NY, USA; with Ambach & Rice. 
 2013. Phasmid,  Ambach & Rice, Los Angeles CA, USA. 
 2014. Dallas Art Fair, Dallas TX, USA; with Ambach & Rice.

Selected publications 
 Ron van der Ende, Galerie Delta, 1990.
 Frits van Dongen, Ron van der Ende, Braden King. The factory set, Frame Publishers, 2015.

References

External links 

 ronvanderende.nl, website

1965 births
Dutch sculptors
Dutch contemporary artists
Dutch installation artists
Living people